Asavyo  also known as Bara Ale  is a large silicic stratovolcano in Ethiopia, which forms part of the Bidu Volcanic complex. It lies about 20 km southwest from the Nabro and Mallahle volcanoes. Asavyo has a 12 km wide caldera.

References

Mountains of Ethiopia
Stratovolcanoes of Ethiopia
Calderas of Ethiopia